Stephen DeRosa (born June 10, 1968) is an American actor. He is best known for portraying Eddie Cantor in the television series Boardwalk Empire (2010–2013).

Education
He attended Georgetown University in Washington, D.C., as an undergraduate, and graduated from the Yale School of Drama in New Haven, Connecticut, with a Master of Fine Arts in 1995.

Career
Although DeRosa's career has primarily been in the theatre, he has also made several television appearances.

He appeared at a staged reading of You Can't Take It With You for The Acting Company at Playwrights Horizons, with F. Murray Abraham.

Television work
 The Man Who Came to Dinner (2000), television film
 guest appearances on the Law & Order, Third Watch and Ugly Betty television series
recurring role as Eddie Cantor on Boardwalk Empire
Wormwood (2017)

Theatre work
Broadway
 The Man Who Came to Dinner (2000)
 Into the Woods (2002)
 Henry IV (2003)
 Twentieth Century (2004)
 Hairspray (2005)
 On the Town (2014)

Touring
 West Side Story (2011)

Off-Broadway
 Measure for Measure (1993)
 Love's Fire: Fresh Numbers by Seven American Playwrights (1998–1999)
 The Mystery of Irma Vep (1998–1999)
 Newyorkers (2001) 
 The It Girl (2001)
 Walmartopia (2007)

Regional
 Falsettos (1995)
 Peter Pan (2008), Stephen Sondheim Center for the Performing Arts, Fairfield, Iowa

Notes

External links
 
 
 
Artist's website
"Stephen DeRosa: Master of the QuickChange ..., Actor With a Mile High Comic Flair", Curtain Up, Elyse Sommer

1968 births
American male stage actors
Georgetown University alumni
Living people
Yale School of Drama alumni